

Incumbents
Monarch: Joseph I

Events
January 7–20 - Siege of Ciudad Rodrigo (1812)
March 16-April 6 - Siege of Badajoz (1812)
April 9 - Battle of Arlabán (1812)
June 29-August 19 - Siege of Astorga (1812)
July 22 - Battle of Salamanca
October 25–29 - Battle of Tordesillas (1812)

Births

Deaths

 
1810s in Spain
Years of the 19th century in Spain